Arthur George Jenkins was an Australian politician. He was a member of the Western Australian Legislative Council representing the South-East Province from his election on 22 May 1898 until the end of his term in 1925. Jenkins was a member of the Liberal Party of Australia.

References 

Members of the Western Australian Legislative Council
19th-century Australian politicians
20th-century Australian politicians